Elisabeth Seitz (born 4 November 1993) is a German artistic gymnast. She is the 2022 European champion and the 2018 World bronze medalist on the uneven bars. She is one of the only female gymnasts in history to compete the Def (full-twisting Gienger) release, and her eponymous skill, a full-twisting Maloney. Seitz has also had success in the individual all-around event, where she is the 2011 European silver medalist and an eight-time German national champion (2010–13, 2015, 2017–18, 2021).  She is a three-time Olympian, representing Germany at the 2012 Summer Olympics in London, the 2016 Summer Olympics in Rio de Janeiro, where she led her team to a sixth-place finish and placed fourth in the uneven bars final, and the 2020 Summer Olympics in Tokyo. In 2022, she was part of the first German team to ever win a European team medal.

Career

2010 
Seitz competed at the 2010 World Artistic Gymnastics Championships, alongside Oksana Chusovitina, Lisa Katharina Hill, Joeline Mobius, Pia Tolle, and Giulia Hindermann. The team placed 11th in the qualifications, meaning they didn't advance to the team final. Seitz, however, qualified to the individual all-around final in 15th place, and to the uneven bars final in 6th place. She finished 12th in the all-around, with a score of  56.157 and came in 8th place in the uneven bars final, after falling on her full-twisting Gienger, called a Def, and her toe-on to piked tkatchev, called a Church, and score a 10.466.

2011 
At the 2011 European Championships, Seitz finished second in the all-around behind Anna Dementyeva with a score of 56.700. She finished 5th in the vault final with a score of 14.187. She finished 5th in the uneven bars final with a score of 14.175.

At the 2011 Switzerland-Germany-Romania Friendly, Seitz contributed scores on vault, bars, and beam towards Germany's second-place finish.

At the 2011 World Championships, Seitz contributed scores on all four apparatus towards Germany's sixth-place finish in the team final. In the individual all-around she finished eleventh with a score of 55.823.

2012

2012 Olympics 
Germany finished ninth in the team qualification round, so they did not qualify into the final. They were only 0.365 behind Canada.  However, Seitz qualified twelfth into the all-around final, and eighth into the uneven bars final. In the individual all-around final, Seitz finished 10th with a score of 57.365. In the uneven bars final, Seitz finished in sixth with a score of 15.266.

In December 2012 she competed at the 2012 World Cup event in Stuttgart and placed second with a total score of 55.566. A week later she competed in Glasgow and again took silver, this time with a score of 54.799.

2013–2014 
After the Olympic season, she competed at the 2013 American Cup and the 2013 World Championships, even though she was not fully prepared due to her studies. She continued competing through the 2014 season. Her World Championship chances were questioned due to injuries, but she made the team. However, she competed only on bars where she had a fall. She later competed at the 2014 Arthur Gander Memorial, finally putting together solid routines and snatched the bronze, behind the silver medalist Larisa Iordache and the gold medalist Daria Spiridonova. She won another bronze along with Fabian Hambüchen at the Swiss Cup behind the Russian and Ukrainian teams.

2015 
Seitz competed at the 2015 São Paulo World Cup in May where she won bronze on uneven bars behind Shang Chunsong of China and compatriot Sophie Scheder and silver on floor exercise behind Flávia Saraiva of Brazil.  Later that month she competed at the Flanders International Team Challenge in Ghent where she helped Germany win gold in the team final and individually she placed thirteenth in the all-around.

In June Seitz was selected to compete at the 2015 European Games with Sophie Scheder and Leah Griesser. The team won a silver medal behind Russia.

In September Seitz competed at the German National Championships where she won gold in the all-around, finishing ahead of Pauline Schäfer and Sophie Scheder.  Additionally she won gold on uneven bars, silver on balance beam behind Schäfer, and placed fourth on floor exercise.  In October she placed first in the all-around at the German World Trials.

In October Seitz competed at the World Championships alongside Griesser, Lisa Katharina Hill, Schäfer, Scheder, and Pauline Tratz.  During qualifications Seitz helped Germany place twelfth and they did not qualify to the team final.  Individually Seitz finished twenty-sixth in the all-around qualifications and advanced to the final.  There she scored 55.765 which resulted in a tenth-place finish.  Seitz ended the season competing at the Swiss Cup, a mixed gender event.  She was partnered with Sebastian Krimmer and they finished ninth.

2016 
Seitz competed at the Glasgow World Cup in March where she finished second behind MyKayla Skinner of the United States.  The following week she competed at the DTB Team Challenge where Germany placed second behind Russia.

In April Seitz competed at the 2016 Test Event, helping her team to finish 2nd behind host team Brazil, qualifying a full team to the Olympic Games. Individually, she won the test event titles on bars ahead of her teammate Sophie Scheder.  In June she competed at the German National Championships where she placed second behind Scheder.  In July she competed at the Olympic Team Trials where she once again placed second behind Scheder.  Seitz was selected as one of the representatives of the German national team in 2016 Summer Olympics together with Kim Bui, Tabea Alt, Pauline Schäfer and Scheder.

At the 2016 Summer Olympics the German team pulled off a surprise top 8 finish to secure a spot in the team final, after Italy suffered three falls on beam and Canada counted falls on bars and beam. Individually, Seitz qualified to both the uneven bars and individual all around finals. In the team final, Seitz competed on bars, beam and floor to help her team to a sixth-place finish. In the all around final, she finished in seventeenth place. In the uneven bars final she placed fourth behind 2012 Olympic Uneven Bars Champion Aliya Mustafina of Russia, 2015 World Uneven Bars Co-Champion Madison Kocian of the United States, and compatriot Scheder.

2017
In March Seitz competed at the DTB Pokal Team Challenge where she helped Germany place second behind Russia.   In April Seitz competed at the 2017 European Championships in Cluj-Napoca. She qualified to the uneven bars in joint first with Nina Derwael of Belgium. During the final, however, she missed a connection and finished in third place, tied with Ellie Downie of Great Britain and finishing behind Derwael and Elena Eremina of Russia.

In June Seitz competed at the German National Championships where she won gold in the all-around, on uneven bars, and on balance beam.

In October Seitz competed at the World Championships where she qualified to the all-around and uneven bars finals.  She placed ninth in the all-around and fifth on uneven bars.  In November she competed at the Swiss Cup, a mixed gender competition where she was partnered with Marcel Nguyen.  They finished fifth.  Later that month she competed at the Cottbus World Cup where she won gold on uneven bars.

2018
In March Seitz competed at the American Cup where she placed sixth but tied for the highest uneven bars score alongside American Morgan Hurd.  Later that month she competed at the Stuttgart World Cup where she placed second behind Zhang Jin of China.  She next competed at the Tokyo World Cup where she placed fifth.

In September Seitz competed at the German Championships where she won gold in the all-around and on uneven bars and she won silver on floor exercise behind Leah Griesser.

At the 2018 World Championships Seitz helped Germany qualify to the team final and individually she qualified to the all-around and uneven bars finals.  During the team final she contributed scores on vault, uneven bars, and floor exercise towards Germany's eighth-place finish.  During the all-around final Seitz placed twenty-first.  During the uneven bars final Seitz won the bronze medal behind Nina Derwael of Belgium and Simone Biles of the United States.  Afterwards Seitz competed at the Swiss Cup, a unique mixed pairs event where she was partnered with Marcel Nguyen and together they won gold.

2019
In March Seitz competed at the Stuttgart World Cup where she won bronze behind Simone Biles of the United States and Ana Padurariu of Canada.  In August she competed at the German Championships where she placed fifth in the all-around, first on uneven bars, and second on floor exercise behind Kim Bui.

In September Seitz was named to the team to compete at the 2019 World Championships in Stuttgart alongside Kim Bui, Emelie Petz, Sarah Voss, and Sophie Scheder.  Later that month she competed at a friendly in Worms, Germany where she finished first in the all-around and helped Germany finish first in the team competition.

At the World Championships Seitz competed all four events during qualification and helped Germany place ninth as a team.  Although they did not qualify to the team final, they qualified a team to the 2020 Olympic Games in Tokyo.  Individually Seitz qualified to the all-around and uneven bars finals.  During the all-around final Seitz finished in sixth place and became the highest placing German female gymnast at a World Championships all-around final since Germany's reunification.  Additionally she received the second highest uneven bars score of the day behind reigning World Uneven Bar Champion Nina Derwael of Belgium.  During the uneven bars final Seitz fell off the apparatus and finished in eighth place.

In November Seitz competed at the Swiss Cup alongside Andy Toba.  Together they finished fourth behind the United States (Jade Carey and Allan Bower), the Ukraine (Diana Varinska and Oleg Verniaiev), and Switzerland (Giulia Steingruber and Oliver Hegi).

2020
In late January it was announced that Seitz would compete at the Stuttgart World Cup taking place in March.  In early February it was announced that she would also compete at the Birmingham World Cup taking place in late March.  The Stuttgart World Cup was later canceled due to the COVID-19 pandemic in Germany.  Additionally the Birmingham World Cup was canceled due to the COVID-19 pandemic in the United Kingdom.

2021
In April Seitz competed at the European Championships where she qualified to the all-around and uneven bars finals.  During the all-around final, in which she placed fifth, Seitz and compatriot Kim Bui wore unitards opposed to the standard leotard that is common in women's artistic gymnastics.  While unitards are usually worn for religious reasons, the German gymnasts opted to wear them as a statement "against sexualization in gymnastics".  During the uneven bars final Seitz fell off the apparatus and placed seventh.

On June 13 Seitz was selected to represent Germany at the 2020 Summer Olympics alongside Sarah Voss, Kim Bui, and Pauline Schäfer, marking her third Olympic appearance.  In qualifications at the Olympic Games Germany finished ninth as a team and did not advance to the finals.  However Seitz advanced to both the all-around and uneven bars finals.

2022
In June, Seitz competed at the German Championships, where she took the silver medal in the uneven bars final behind Kim Bui.

In August, Seitz competed at the European Championships in Munich, where she helped Germany qualify to the team final in fourth place. Individually, she also qualified to the uneven bars final in fifth place. In the team final, the German team of Seitz, Kim Bui, Pauline Schäfer, Sarah Voss and Emma Malewski won the bronze medal behind Italy and Great Britain — Germany's first team medal in European Championship history. In the uneven bars final, Seitz won the gold medal ahead of Alice D'Amato and Lorette Charpy with a score of 14.433.

Eponymous skill 
Seitz has one eponymous skill listed in the Code of Points.

Competitive history

References

External links 

  
 
 
 

1993 births
Living people
Sportspeople from Heidelberg
German female artistic gymnasts
Olympic gymnasts of Germany
Gymnasts at the 2012 Summer Olympics
Gymnasts at the 2016 Summer Olympics
Gymnasts at the 2015 European Games
European Games medalists in gymnastics
European Games silver medalists for Germany
Originators of elements in artistic gymnastics
Medalists at the World Artistic Gymnastics Championships
Gymnasts at the 2020 Summer Olympics
European champions in gymnastics